Lumsk is a Norwegian folk metal band from Trondheim. The band combines traditional Norwegian folk music and folklore with rock, progressive rock and metal. The group has both male and female vocals with violin, guitar and drums.

History
After having released a self-produced demo, the band released an EP called Åsmund Frægdegjevar in 2001 under contract with the record company Spinefarm Records. The next year, the band moved to Tabu Recordings and released their debut album, which had the same title as the previously released EP. The album was characterized by its blend of classical instruments and heavy metal. The songs make up a narrative about the saga of Åsmund, who in Lumsk's interpretation sails from Ireland to rescue a king's daughter from a group of trolls.

Several years later, and with a new vocalist, the band released its second album, called Troll. The album was a departure in many ways from its predecessor - the band had gotten a new vocalist and guitarist, and as a whole the music was not as heavy or dark as on the debut album. There were also fewer songs, and together they did not compose one narrative, but were rather stories in and of themselves; stories which were based on Nordic mythology and were written by the saga author Birger Sivertsen and his wife Kristin.

The same year the band released the single Nidvisa, which, in addition to the song Allvis from Troll, contained a song written for the action group Give Us Back Christmas (Gi oss jula tilbake in Norwegian) in protest against department stores' early Christmas decorating. The profits from the sale of the single also went to the group.

On February 26, 2007, Lumsk released their third full-length album, entitled Det Vilde Kor. On this album, Lumsk have added music to Det Vilde Kor, which is a collection of poems written by the famous Norwegian poet Knut Hamsun. With this album the music departed from its folk metal sound and incorporated a calmer and slightly more progressive nature.

In July 2007 Espen announced on Lumsk's website that Ketil and Siv Lena would be leaving the band due to a baby being born. They were replaced by Swedish musicians Håkan Lundqvist and Jenny Gustafsson. In 2009 Annelise Ofstad Aar joined the band, as a replacement for vocalist Stine Mari Langstrand, who also left in 2007.

On March 10, 2023 Lumsk released a double single for their upcoming album Fremmede toner, under their new label Dark Essence Records.

Members

Current
Espen Warankov Godø - keyboards (2000-)
Eystein Garberg - guitar (2001-)
Espen Hammer - bass guitar (2002-)
Roar Grindheim - guitar (2012-)
Vidar Berg - drums (2005-)
Mari Klingen - vocals (2020-)
Siv Lena Laugtug Sæther – violin (2001–2007, 2021 -)

Former
Snorre Hovdal - bass guitar and backing vocals
Bjørnar Selsbak - guitar
Øyvind R - guitar
Vibeke Arntzen - vocals
Sondre Øien - bass guitar
Steinar Årdal - male vocals
Alf Helge Lund - drums (1999–2005)
Ketil Sæther - guitar (2004–2007 - 2009–2012)
Stine Mari Langstrand - vocals (2004–2007)
Håkan Lundqvist - guitar (2007)
Jenny Gustafsson - violin (2007)
Annelise Ofstad Aar - vocals (2009-2019)

Discography

Albums
Åsmund Frægdegjevar (2003)
Troll (2005)
Det Vilde Kor (2007)
Fremmede Toner (2023)

Demos and singles
Demo 2001 (demo, 2001)
Nidvisa (single, 2005)
Det Døde Barn/Das Tode Kind (single, 2023)

References

External links
Official website
Official MySpace

Norwegian folk metal musical groups
Musical groups established in 1999
1999 establishments in Norway
Musical groups from Trondheim